Birds Run is an unincorporated community in Guernsey County, in the U.S. state of Ohio.

History
Birds Run was originally called Bridgeville, and under the latter name was laid out in 1848. A post office called Birds Run was established in 1851, and remained in operation until 1953. Besides the post office, Birds Run had a country store and two churches.

References

Unincorporated communities in Guernsey County, Ohio
Unincorporated communities in Ohio